Chechi is a 1950 Indian Malayalam-language film, directed by T. Janaki Ram and produced by Swami Narayanan. The film stars Kottarakkara Sreedharan Nair and Miss Kumari in lead roles. 
The film was dubbed into Tamil with the title Nadigai and was released in 1951. It is the debut film of music director G. K. Venkatesh, playback singer T. A. Lakshmi and director T. Janakiram. It is known for the classical-based song "Kalitha Kalamaya Kailasavasa".

Cast
 Kottarakkara Sreedharan Nair
 Miss Kumari
 Aranmula Ponnamma
 T. R. Omana
 Cherthala Vasudeva Kurup
 S. A. Hameed
 S. P. Pillai
 Vaikkom Raju

Soundtrack
"Aasha Thakarukayo" - Kalinga Rao, Kaviyoor CK Revamma
"Kalitha Kalaamaya" - Kaviyoor CK Revamma
"Varika Varika" - GK Venkitesh, Kaviyoor
"Varumo En" - TA Lakshmi
"Athi Dooreyirunnu" - N/A
"Oh Ponnushassa" - Mohanakumari
"Oru Vichaaram" - Kalinga Rao, Mohanakumari
"Chirakaala Manobhaavam" - Kalinga Rao, Mohanakumari
"Nee Maathraminnu" - Mohanakumari
"Chudu Chintha Than" - Kalinga Rao, Mohanakumari
"Vaasavathi" - VN Rajan

References

 

1950 films
1950s Malayalam-language films
Films scored by G. K. Venkatesh